Brendan Allen (born December 28, 1995) is an American mixed martial artist currently competing in the middleweight division of the Ultimate Fighting Championship. A professional since 2015, he has also competed for the Legacy Fighting Alliance where he is the former Middleweight Champion. As of February 27, 2023, he is #12 in the UFC middleweight rankings.

Background 
Allen was born to Michelle Allen and James Allen of Louisiana. Allen has an older brother, James Jr. Brendan started training in Brazilian jiu-jitsu when he was 13 after watching a jiu-jitsu class with his brother. In high school Allen started competing in Mississippi after he had some training in wrestling and boxing. Allen attended university at Southeastern Louisiana University, majoring in criminal justice. He later joined Clementi's Gladiator Academy to train in mixed martial arts. After winning the IMMAF 2015 Amateur Middleweight Championship, Allen turned to compete in professional MMA.

Mixed martial arts career

Early career 
Allen started his professional MMA career in 2015 and fought under various promotions in the South. He was the Legacy Fighting Alliance middleweight champion twice, defeating Tim Hiley and Moses Murrietta at LFA 50 and LFA 61, respectively.

Dana White's Contender Series 
Allen appeared in Dana White's Contender Series 20 on July 16, 2019, facing Aaron Jeffery. He won the fight via a submission in the first round. With this win, he was awarded a UFC contract.

Ultimate Fighting Championship 
In his UFC debut, Allen was scheduled to face Eric Spicely on October 18, 2019, at UFC on ESPN: Reyes vs. Weidman. However, Spicely was forced to withdraw from the event due to an undisclosed reason. Allen instead faced Kevin Holland. He won the fight via a submission in round two.

Allen's next fight came on February 29, 2020, facing Tom Breese at UFC Fight Night: Benavidez vs. Figueiredo. He won the fight by TKO in the first round.

Allan was scheduled to face Ian Heinisch on June 27, 2020, at UFC on ESPN: Poirier vs. Hooker. However, Heinisch pulled out of the match up in mid-June citing an injury and was replaced by promotional newcomer Kyle Daukaus. He won the fight via unanimous decision.

The bout between Heinisch and Allen was rescheduled again on November 7, 2020, at UFC on ESPN: Santos vs. Teixeira. On the day of the event, the UFC announced the bout was once again canceled due to Heinisch tested  positive for COVID-19.

Allen faced Sean Strickland on November 14, 2020, at UFC Fight Night: Felder vs. dos Anjos. He lost the fight via technical knockout.

Allen faced Karl Roberson on April 24, 2021, at UFC 261. He won the bout via ankle hook submission at the end of the first round.

Replacing injured Anthony Hernandez, Allen faced Punahele Soriano on July 24, 2021, at UFC on ESPN: Sandhagen vs. Dillashaw. Allen won the fight via unanimous decision.

Allen was scheduled to face Brad Tavares on December 4, 2021, at UFC on ESPN: Font vs. Aldo. Tavares pulled out in mid November and was replaced by Roman Dolidze. In turn Dolidze was forced to pull from the bout due to complications in his recovery from COVID-19 and he was replaced by Chris Curtis. Allen lost the fight via technical knockout in round two.

Allen faced Sam Alvey, replacing Phil Hawes, on February 5, 2022, at UFC Fight Night 200. He won the fight via rear-naked choke submission in the second round.

Allen faced Jacob Malkoun on June 11, 2022, at UFC 275. He won the bout via unanimous decision.

Allen faced Krzysztof Jotko on October 1, 2022, at UFC Fight Night: Dern vs. Yan. He won the bout at the end of the first round, submitting Jotko via rear-naked choke. This win earned him the Performance of the Night award.

Allen faced André Muniz on February 25, 2023, at UFC Fight Night 220. He won the fight via a rear-naked choke submission in round three. This win earned him the Performance of the Night bonus.

Championships and accomplishments
Ultimate Fighting Championship
Performance of the Night (Two times) 
 Legacy Fighting Alliance
 LFA Middleweight Champion (Two times) .
 International Mixed Martial Arts Federation  (IMMAF)
 IMMAF 2015 Amateur Middleweight Champion

Personal life 
Allen is married to his wife Suzette. In December 2019, the couple had their first daughter, Brenleigh.

Mixed martial arts record 

|-
|Win
|align=center|21–5
|André Muniz
|Submission (rear-naked choke)
|UFC Fight Night: Muniz vs. Allen
|
|align=center|3
|align=center|4:25
|Las Vegas, Nevada, United States
|
|-
|Win
|align=center|20–5
|Krzysztof Jotko
|Submission (rear-naked choke)
|UFC Fight Night: Dern vs. Yan
|
|align=center|1
|align=center|4:17
|Las Vegas, Nevada, United States
|
|-
|Win
|align=center|19–5
|Jacob Malkoun
|Decision (unanimous)
|UFC 275
|
|align=center|3
|align=center|5:00
|Kallang, Singapore
|
|-
|Win
|align=center|18–5
|Sam Alvey
|Submission (rear-naked choke)
|UFC Fight Night: Hermansson vs. Strickland
| 
|align=center|2
|align=center|2:10
|Las Vegas, Nevada, United States
|
|-
|Loss
|align=center|17–5
|Chris Curtis
|TKO (punches and knees)
|UFC on ESPN: Font vs. Aldo 
|
|align=center|2
|align=center|1:58
|Las Vegas, Nevada, United States
|
|-
|Win
|align=center|17–4
|Punahele Soriano
|Decision (unanimous)
|UFC on ESPN: Sandhagen vs. Dillashaw 
|
|align=center|3
|align=center|5:00
|Las Vegas, Nevada, United States
|
|-
|Win
|align=center|16–4
|Karl Roberson
|Submission (ankle lock)
|UFC 261 
|
|align=center|1
|align=center|4:55
|Jacksonville, Florida, United States
|
|-
|Loss
|align=center|15–4
|Sean Strickland
|TKO (punches)
|UFC Fight Night: Felder vs. dos Anjos
|
|align=center|2
|align=center|1:32
|Las Vegas, Nevada, United States
|
|-
|Win
|align=center|15–3
|Kyle Daukaus
|Decision (unanimous)
|UFC on ESPN: Poirier vs. Hooker
|
|align=center|3
|align=center|5:00
|Las Vegas, Nevada, United States
|
|-
|Win
|align=center|14–3
|Tom Breese
|TKO (elbows and punches)
|UFC Fight Night: Benavidez vs. Figueiredo
|
|align=center|1
|align=center|4:47
|Norfolk, Virginia, United States
|
|-
|Win
|align=center|13–3
|Kevin Holland
|Submission (rear-naked choke)
|UFC on ESPN: Reyes vs. Weidman
|
|align=center|2
|align=center|3:38
|Boston, Massachusetts, United States
|
|-
|Win
|align=center|12–3
|Aaron Jeffery
|Submission (rear-naked choke)
|Dana White's Contender Series 20
|
|align=center|1
|align=center|3:23
|Las Vegas, Nevada, United States
|
|-
|Win
|align=center|11–3
|Moses Murrietta
|Decision (unanimous)
|LFA 61
|
|align=center|5
|align=center|5:00
|Prior Lake, Minnesota, United States
|
|-
|Win
|align=center|10–3
|Tim Hiley
|Submission (rear-naked choke)
|LFA 50
|
|align=center|3
|align=center|3:16
|Prior Lake, Minnesota, United States
|
|-
|Win
|align=center|9–3
|Larry Crowe
|TKO (punches)
|LFA 43
|
|align=center|1
|align=center|2:06
|Beaumont, Texas, United States
|
|-
|Loss
|align=center|8–3
|Anthony Hernandez
|Decision (unanimous)
|LFA 32
|
|align=center|5
|align=center|5:00
|Lake Charles, Louisiana, United States
|
|-
|Win
|align=center|8–2
|Chris Harris
|Submission (triangle choke)
|LFA 18
|
|align=center|5
|align=center|5:00
|Shawnee, Oklahoma, United States
|
|-
|Loss
|align=center|7–2
|Eryk Anders
|Decision (unanimous)
|LFA 14
|
|align=center|5
|align=center|5:00
|Houston, Texas, United States
|
|-
|Win
|align=center|7–1
|Jon Kirk
|TKO (punches)
|LFA 3
|
|align=center|1
|align=center|2:46
|Lake Charles, Louisiana, United States
|
|-
|Win
|align=center|6–1
|Sidney Wheeler
|Submission (keylock)
|Valor Fights 3
|
|align=center|2
|align=center|0:29
|Knoxville, Tennessee, United States
|
|-
|Win
|align=center|5–1
|Matt Jones
|Submission (rear-naked choke)
|MCFP 2
|
|align=center|1
|align=center|3:34
|Avondale, Louisiana, United States
|
|-
|Win
|align=center|4–1
|Clovis Hancock
|Submission (rear-naked choke)
|Legacy FC 58
|
|align=center|2
|align=center|1:54
|Lake Charles, Louisiana, United States
|
|-
|Win
|align=center|3–1
|Charlie Rader
|Submission (rear-naked choke)
|WFC 52
|
|align=center|1
|align=center|3:26
|Baton Rouge, Louisiana, United States
|
|-
|Loss
|align=center|2–1
|Trevin Giles
|Submission (rear-naked choke)
|Legacy FC 52
|
|align=center|2
|align=center|1:47
|Lake Charles, Louisiana, United States
|
|-
|Win
|align=center|2–0
|Kory Moegenburg
|TKO (punches)
|WFC 46
|
|align=center|1
|align=center|4:03
|Baton Rouge, Louisiana, United States
|
|-
|Win
|align=center|1–0
|Zebulon Stroud
|TKO (punches)
|WFC 42
|
|align=center|1
|align=center|4:40
|Baton Rouge, Louisiana, United States
|
|-

See also 

 List of current UFC fighters
 List of male mixed martial artists

References

External links
 
 

1995 births
Living people
Middleweight mixed martial artists
Mixed martial artists utilizing boxing
Mixed martial artists utilizing Brazilian jiu-jitsu
Mixed martial artists utilizing wrestling
Mixed martial artists from Wisconsin
Mixed martial artists from Louisiana
American male mixed martial artists
American practitioners of Brazilian jiu-jitsu
People awarded a black belt in Brazilian jiu-jitsu
Ultimate Fighting Championship male fighters